Bruchac is a surname. Notable people with the surname include:

Jesse Bruchac (born 1972), American author and language teacher 
Joseph Bruchac (born 1942), American author